Sideractinidae is a family of corals belonging to the order Corallimorpharia.

Genera:
 Nectactis Gravier, 1918
 Sideractis Danielssen, 1890

References

Corallimorpharia
Cnidarian families